Dear, Dearest, Beloved, Unique ...  (translit. Milyy, dorogoy, lyubimyy, edinstvennyy ... ) is a 1984 Soviet drama film directed by Dinara Asanova. It was screened in the Un Certain Regard section at the 1985 Cannes Film Festival.

Cast
 Olga Mashnaya as Anna
 Valeriy Priyomykhov as Vadim
 Lembit Ulfsak as German
 Larisa Umarova as Vera
 Nikolai Lavrov as Vsevolod
 Aleksandr Demyanenko as policeman
 Darya Moroz as girl

References

External links

1984 films
1980s teen drama films
Films directed by Dinara Asanova
Lenfilm films
Russian teen drama films
Soviet teen drama films